Alexander Valeryevich Sladkov (born April 1, 1966, Monino, Moscow Region, USSR) is a Russian military correspondent and a special correspondent for the Izvestia program.

Biography 

Sladkov graduated from Kurgan Higher Military-Political Aviation School in 1987. In 1992 retired from the Armed Forces of the Russian Federation with the rank of Senior lieutenant (First lieutenant). From 1992 to 1993, he worked as a correspondent for the regional newspaper "Vremya" in the town of Shchelkovo in the Moscow Region and the program "Voice of Russia" on Radio Rossii.

He studied journalism at the Faculty of Humanities University, graduating with an externship. Since 1993, Sladkov has worked on the television channel "Rossiya" as a correspondent of the program "Izvestiya". From April 2002 to September 2015 he was the author, manager, and presenter of the "Military Program", and from September 2003 to January 2004 he was the presenter of the TV entertainment program "Steep Route". Sladkov broadcast news from Grozny during the battles of the Russian forces against the Chechen Republic of Ichkeria in January 1995, March and August 1996, and January 2000.On August 9, 2008, he was wounded in the leg during the Russian military invasion of Georgia.

He covered the Transnistria conflict, the Tajikistani Civil war, the Chechen war, and Russo-Georgian war in 2008 and Russo-Ukrainian war. Since 2014, he has been a member of the Public Council under the Ministry of Defense of the Russian Federation.

Work in Ukraine 
Since the beginning of Russian aggression against Ukraine in 2014, Alexander Sladkov has worked in the occupied territories (without official permission and accreditation from Ukrainian government), justifying Russian invasion to Ukraine and Russian army's war crimes against Ukrainian civilians.

Sladkov regularly conducts interrogations of Ukrainian prisoners of war and political prisoners after being tortured by the Russian special services. One of the most famous victim was Ukrainian journalist and writer Stanislav Aseyev from Donetsk.

In April 2020 Alexander Sladkov published a video on his YouTube channel showing Russian positions near the Ukrainian-controlled town of Horlivka, Donetsk Region. In this video the separatists fired from 122 mm caliber Partisan launcher (improvised launcher for MLRS BM-21 Grad), which was prohibited according to Minsk agreements that were rejected by both sides .

Personal life
Alexander Sladkov is married, and has four children. They live in Moscow.

Awards
Order of Honor (1996) - for active participation in the creation and development of the All-Russian State Television and Radio Broadcasting Company.

Honorary weapon (1999) - from the Russian Minister of Defense, Marshal of the Russian Federation I.D. Sergeev.

Order of Courage (2000), for self-sacrifice in covering events in the North Caucasus region.

Award of the Federal Security Service of Russia (nomination "Television and Radio Programs", 2006) - for the propaganda film "The End of the Black Angel".

Award of the Federal Security Service of Russia (nomination "Television and Radio Programs", 2013) - for the propaganda film "Fire Bail. Those who survived" 

Award of the Federal Security Service of Russia (nomination "Television and Radio Programs", 2019–2020) - for the propaganda film "Operation Argun" 

A valuable gift (2007) from the Russian Minister of Defence S. B. Ivanov - for active assistance in completing of missions of the Armed Forces of the Russian Federation.

Order of Courage (2009) - for self-sacrifice in covering events during the Russo-Georgian war

Order of Friendship (2013, self-proclaimed non-recognized Republic of South Ossetia) - for significant personal contribution to the development of friendly Russian-South Ossetian relations, high professionalism, courage, and selflessness demonstrated during the Russo-Georgian war.

«Военкор» 'War Correspondent medal, (November 2020, 'Wave of Memory' Organisation, Moscow).

See also 

 Alexander Kots
Semen Pegov
Evgeniy Poddubny
Anatoly Shariy
Dmitry Steshin 
Russian information war against Ukraine

References 

1966 births
Living people
21st-century Russian journalists
Russian propagandists